Badureliya Sports Club is a first-class cricket team in Sri Lanka. It plays its home matches at Surrey Village Cricket Ground, Maggona.

In late 2008, the club threatened to boycott the Sri Lankan domestic tournaments due to their objections to being relegated to Tier B from their position in Tier A. The club later backed down from their stance, and defeated Nondescripts Cricket Club by an innings and two runs.

Between 2005–06, when they first appeared in first-class cricket, and late December 2015, Badureliya Sports Club played 97 first-class matches, for 13 wins, 37 losses and 47 draws. 

Badureliya Sports Club won the Sri Lanka Cricket Twenty-20 Tournament in 2014–15.

Current squad 
These players featured in matches for Badureliya SC in the 2019/20 season.

Players with international caps are listed in bold.

References

External links
 Badureliya Sports Club at Cricinfo
 Matches played by Badureliya Sports Club

Sri Lankan first-class cricket teams